Victor Duggan (16 October 1910, West Maitland, New South Wales – 24 March 2007, Queensland) was a motorcycle speedway racer who won the London Riders' Championship in 1947 whilst with the Harringay Racers.

He started his career in 1937 with the Hackney Wick Wolves, before spells with the Bristol Bulldogs in 1938 and Wimbledon Dons in 1939. In 1947, he returned to the UK with the Harringay Racers. Was a co-director of the Sydney Sports Ground with Lionel Van Praag and Max Grosskreutz where he held the track record. 

Vic Duggan won his first Australian Solo Championship in 1941 at the Sydney Sports Ground. He followed this up with the 1947 Aussie title, again at the Sports Ground and backed up to win three Aussie titles in 1948 (2 x 2 lap and 1 x 3 lap) at both the Sports Ground and the Sydney Showground Speedway. He was also NSW State Champion in 1940 and 1947. Many believe Vic would have won more Australian and NSW titles had it not been for World War II when racing was suspended.

He competed in the British Riders' Championship in 1947 and 1948. This competition was held in place of the Individual Speedway World Championship between 1946 and 1948. He was favourite to win in 1947 but fell in his fourth race and did not start his fifth. He won the title in 1948 with 14 points.

Vic Duggan competed in the 1950 World Final at London's, Wembley Stadium where he finished in 13th place after scoring 4 points.

Duggan died of natural causes following a seizure on 24 March 2007, in a hospital in Queensland.

World Final Appearances
 1950 –  London, Wembley Stadium – 13th – 4pts

References

1910 births
2007 deaths
Australian speedway riders
People from New South Wales
Hackney Wick Wolves riders
Harringay Racers riders
Wimbledon Dons riders
Bristol Bulldogs riders